Amblyglyphidodon is a genus of fish in the family Pomacentridae. These damselfish swim singly, in pairs, or in small groups. They are often found among corals.

Species
There are currently 11 recognized species in this genus:
 Amblyglyphidodon aureus (G. Cuvier, 1830) (Golden damselfish)
 Amblyglyphidodon batunai G. R. Allen, 1995 (Batuna damsel)
 Amblyglyphidodon curacao (Bloch, 1787) (Staghorn damselfish) 
 Amblyglyphidodon flavilatus G. R. Allen & J. E. Randall, 1980 (Yellowfin damsel)
 Amblyglyphidodon flavopurpureus G. R. Allen, Erdmann & Drew, 2012 (Cenderawasih damselfish) 
 Amblyglyphidodon indicus G. R. Allen & J. E. Randall, 2002 (Maldives damselfish)    
 Amblyglyphidodon leucogaster (Bleeker, 1847) (Yellowbelly damselfish)
 Amblyglyphidodon melanopterus G. R. Allen & J. E. Randall, 2002    
 Amblyglyphidodon orbicularis (Hombron & Jacquinot, 1853)
 Amblyglyphidodon silolona G. R. Allen, Erdmann & Drew, 2012 (Silolona damselfish) 
 Amblyglyphidodon ternatensis (Bleeker, 1853) (Ternate damsel)

References

 
Pomacentrinae
Marine fish genera
Taxa named by Pieter Bleeker